Germany participated in the Eurovision Song Contest 2022 in Turin, Italy with the song "Rockstars" performed by Malik Harris. The national final took place on 4 March 2022 and featured six competing acts with the winner being selected through online radio voting and public voting.

Background 

Germany, to this point, has been noted for having competed in the contest more than any other country; they have competed in every contest since the first edition in 1956 except for the  when the nation was eliminated in a pre-contest elimination round. In , the German entry "I Don't Feel Hate" performed by Jendrik placed twenty-fifth out of twenty-six competing songs scoring 3 points.

The German national broadcaster, ARD, broadcasts the event within Germany and delegates the selection of the nation's entry to the regional broadcaster  (NDR). NDR confirmed that Germany would participate in the 2022 Eurovision Song Contest on 19 March 2021. Between 2013 and 2019, NDR set up national finals with several artists to choose both the song and performer to compete at Eurovision for Germany, while an internal selection was organised in 2020 and 2021. On 3 November 2021, the broadcaster announced that they would organise a multi-artist national final to select the German entry.

Before Eurovision

Germany 12 Points 
Germany 12 Points was the competition that selected Germany's entry for the Eurovision Song Contest 2022. The competition took place on 4 March 2022 at the Studio Berlin Adlershof in Berlin, and was hosted by Barbara Schöneberger. The show was broadcast on Das Erste and One as well as via radio on the nine ARD radio channels and online via the broadcaster's Eurovision Song Contest website eurovision.de. The national final was watched by 3.25 million viewers in Germany.

Competing entries 
Interested artists and composers were able to submit their entries for the competition between 4 November 2021 and 30 November 2021. By the end of the process, it was announced that 944 submissions were received by NDR and 25 entries were shortlisted. The six competing entries were selected during a final casting round held in Berlin in January 2022 by a seven-member panel consisting of Alexandra Wolfslast (head of German delegation for Eurovision), Meike Nett (NDR 2 head of music), Holger Lachmann (Antenne Brandenburg head of music), Edi van Beek (Bayern 3 head of music), Gregor Friedel (SWR3 music director), Andreas Loeffler (WDR 2, WDR 4 and 1LIVE head of music) and Alexander Schmitz (MDR Jump music director). The six participating acts were announced during a press conference on 10 February 2022. Before the national final, a show called ESC vor Acht ("ESC pre Eight O'clock"), where the participants presented their songs and discussed topics related to the contest.

Final 
The televised final took place on 4 March 2022. The running order for the participating entries was determined on 23 February 2022 during the show  on Das Erste, hosted by Alina Stiegler and Peter Großmann. The winner, "Rockstars" performed by Malik Harris, was selected through a 100% public voting, being divided into a 50/50 combination of votes from radio voting and public voting, the latter which included options for landline and SMS voting. For the radio vote, listeners were able to vote via the official websites of the nine ARD radio channels between 28 February 2022 and 4 March 2022. In addition to the performances of the competing entries,  Jamala performed her winning song "1944", while  Conchita Wurst performed a medley of Eurovision entries together with  Gitte Hænning and member of  Texas Lightning, Jane Comerford.

Controversy 
After the six acts were announced, the German broadcaster NDR was criticised for the lack of variety in the songs, representing predominantly to the musical genre of pop. Criticism also fell on the fact numerous artists applied to participate, but in the end the choice fell on previously unknown newcomers. Electric Callboy (formerly Eskimo Callboy) had submitted an entry into the national final but was later rejected, which led to the band's fans launching a petition with the aim of granting the band a spot in the competition. Although the petition had gained over 110 thousand signatures, the band was ultimately not invited to compete.

Among the competing acts, Nico Suave (who participated alongside Team Liebe) was criticised for signing a statement of solidarity for Xavier Naidoo in 2015 and then continuing to work with him after his political statements had been repeatedly criticized.

At Eurovision 
According to Eurovision rules, all nations with the exceptions of the host country and the "Big Five" (France, Germany, Italy, Spain and the United Kingdom) are required to qualify from one of two semi-finals in order to compete for the final; the top ten countries from each semi-final progress to the final. As a member of the "Big Five", Germany automatically qualified to compete in the final on 14 May 2022. Germany was set to perform in the first half of the final. In addition to their participation in the final, Germany was also required to broadcast and vote in one of the two semi-finals. This was decided via a draw held during the semi-final allocation draw on 25 January 2022, when it was announced that Germany would be voting in the second semi-final.

At the close of the voting, Germany came in last place with 6 points, all of which came from televoting.

Voting

Points awarded to Germany

Points awarded by Germany

Detailed voting results
The following members comprised the German jury:
 Christian Brost - radio host at hr3
 Jessica Schöne – presenter, host of the 2021 Junior Eurovision national final
 Michelle – singer, represented Germany at the Eurovision Song Contest 2001
 Max Giesinger – musician, singer-songwriter
 Tokunbo Akinro – jazz artist, singer-songwriter

References 

2022
Countries in the Eurovision Song Contest 2022
Eurovision
Eurovision